The 1947 AAFC Draft was the first collegiate draft of the All-America Football Conference (AAFC). It used an inverse order to the teams' final standings in the 1946 season. The Buffalo Bills, which had finished with the same record as the Brooklyn Dodgers, drafted second in each round, with Brooklyn drafting third. 

Beginning in round 16 a type of supplemental draft was held. From rounds 16 through 25, the Cleveland Browns and New York Yankees which were the league's top two teams, did not make any selections. From rounds 21 to 25, the San Francisco 49ers and Los Angeles Dons did not receive any selections.

Although the Miami Seahawks played in the league's inaugural season, the franchise was confiscated by the AAFC prior to the draft for failure to fulfill contractual obligations. Their selections were exercised by their head coach Hampton Poole, and were listed under the name "Florida Seahawks". On December 28, its assets (including its draft choices rights) were sold to a group of entrepreneurs who founded the original Baltimore Colts.

Special Draft
Prior to the regular draft, 'special selections' were made. It is not known why these were not part of the regular draft or in what order they were executed. All teams had two, except the Buffalo Bills, which had four, because the Los Angeles Dons and San Francisco 49ers, each traded one of its choices to Buffalo.

Player selections

References

External links
 1947 AAFC Draft
 1947 AAFC Draft Pick Transactions 

All-America Football Conference
All-America Football Conference
AAFC